Gone Fishin' is the second studio album by San Francisco-based punk rock band Flipper, released in 1984 by  Subterranean Records. The album's artwork featured a depiction of Flipper's tour van as a ready-to-cut-out-and-assemble centerpiece, with similar cutouts of the four band members on the back cover.  At the time of the album's release, Subterranean offered extra empty covers of the album by mail order for $2 for those Flipper fans that wanted to have a cover to cut up and assemble. The album was reissued by Water Records on December 9, 2008, for the first time on CD, with liner notes provided by Buzz Osborne of the Melvins.

Critical reception
Trouser Press wrote that "if you want to understand [Flipper's] creative mind, Gone Fishin’ is the ideal synthesis of sickness and health." The Rough Guide to Rock opined that "only The Stooges' Funhouse comes close to the demented wonder of this record."

Track listing 
"The Light, the Sound, the Rhythm, the Noise" (Loose, Shatter) – 3:43
"First the Heart" (DePace, Loose, Wilkinson) – 5:22
"In Life My Friends" (Falconi, Harris) – 4:22
"Survivors of the Plague" (Loose, Shatter) – 5:17
"Sacrifice" (Shatter) – 4:26
"Talk's Cheap" (Loose, Shatter) – 2:32
"You Nought Me" (Loose, Shatter) – 5:02
"One by One" (Falconi, Shatter) – 6:30

Personnel 
Bruce Loose – vocals (1, 3, 5, 7, 8), bass (2, 4, 6), clavinet (1), congas (4), backing vocals (4)
Will Shatter – vocals (2, 4, 6), bass (1, 3, 5, 7, 8)
Ted Falconi – guitars
Steve DePace – drums, congas (4, 8), synare (7), piano (7)
Kirk "Charles" Heydt – alto saxophone (2)

References

1984 albums
Flipper (band) albums
Subterranean Records albums
Domino Recording Company albums